Pennyhole Bay is a stretch of water situated to the south of the ports of Harwich in Essex and Felixstowe in Suffolk, England where the rivers Stour and Orwell flow into the sea and just east of Walton-on-the-Naze in Essex. Much of the bay is clogged up with Shoals. The Pennyhole Bay Race is an annual gaff rig sailing race which traditionally starts from either Suffolk Yacht Harbour in Levington or from Stone Point.

References
http://www.eastcoastclassics.co.uk/result07.htm
http://uk.autold.com/map-p413.html

Bays of England